Castle Mountain is a forested mountain ridge in Pendleton County, West Virginia, in the United States. Running from the southwest to the northeast, the mountain is bounded to its west by North Fork Mountain and to its east by a series of rolling hills.

References

Landforms of Pendleton County, West Virginia
Ridges of West Virginia